Orielton may refer to:

Orielton Hall, a historic house in Barmouth, Wales
Orielton Wood, in Barmouth, Wales
Orielton, Pembrokeshire, a historic house in Wales, the location of the Orielton Field Studies Centre
Orielton, Harrington Park, New South Wales, Australia, a historic house
Orielton, Tasmania, Australia
Orielton Lagoon, in Tasmania, Australia